The 1996 Victorian state election was held on 30 March 1996.

Retiring Members
A by-election to replace Kelvin Thomson, the Labor member for Pascoe Vale who had resigned to run for the federal election, had been scheduled but was cancelled when the state election was called. The by-election to replace Bob Sercombe, the Labor member for Niddrie who had resigned under similar circumstances, had resulted in the unopposed election of Rob Hulls.

Labor
Ken Coghill MLA (Werribee)
Gerard Vaughan MLA (Clayton) - lost preselection
David Henshaw MLC (Geelong)
Licia Kokocinski MLC (Melbourne West) — lost preselection
Brian Mier MLC (Waverley)

Liberal
John Delzoppo MLA (Narracan)
Don Hayward MLA (Prahran)
Tony Hyams MLA (Dromana)
Ted Tanner MLA (Caulfield)
Graeme Weideman MLA (Frankston)
Geoffrey Connard MLC (Higinbotham)
George Cox MLC (Nunawading)
James Guest MLC (Monash)
Bruce Skeggs MLC (Templestowe)
Haddon Storey MLC (East Yarra)

National
David Evans MLC (North Eastern)

Legislative Assembly
Sitting members are shown in bold text. Successful candidates are highlighted in the relevant colour. Where there is possible confusion, an asterisk (*) is also used.

Legislative Council
Sitting members are shown in bold text. Successful candidates are highlighted in the relevant colour. Where there is possible confusion, an asterisk (*) is also used.

References

Psephos - Adam Carr's Election Archive

Victoria
Candidates for Victorian state elections